Mecynostomidae is a family of acoels. 

 Eumecynostomum altitudi Faubel & Regier, 1983
 Eumecynostomum asterium Hooge & Tyler, 2003
 Eumecynostomum bathycolum (Westblad, 1948)
 Eumecynostomum boreale (Faubel, 1977)
 Eumecynostomum evelinae (Marcus, 1948)
 Eumecynostomum flavescens (Dörjes, 1968)
 Eumecynostomum fragilis (Dörjes, 1968)
 Eumecynostomum juistensis (Dörjes, 1968)
 Eumecynostomum luridum Kozloff, 2000
 Eumecynostomum macrobursalium (Westblad, 1946)
 Eumecynostomum maritimum (Dörjes, 1968)
 Eumecynostomum pallidum (Beklemischev, 1915)
 Eumecynostomum papillosum (Faubel, 1974)
 Eumecynostomum tardum (Ehlers & Dörjes, 1979)
 Eumecynostomum westbladi (Dörjes, 1968)
 Limnoposthia polonica (Kolasa & Faubel, 1974)
 Mecynostomum auritum (Schultze. 1851)
 Mecynostomum caudatum (Uljanin, 1870)
 Mecynostomum filiferum Ax, 1963
 Mecynostomum haplovarium Dörjes 1968
 Mecynostomum predatum Faubel 1976
 Mecynostomum sanguineum (Beklemischev, 1915)
 Mecynostomum torquens Kozloff 2000
 Neomecynostomum granulum (Dörjes, 1968)
 Paramecynostomum carchedonium Kozloff, 1998
 Paramecynostomum diversicolor (Ørsted, 1845)
 Philomecynostomum lapillum Dörjes, 1968
 Postmecynostomum glandulosum (Westblad, 1946)
 Postmecynostomum pictum Dörjes, 1968
 Stylomecynostomum bodegensis Hooge & Tyler, 2003

References

Acoelomorphs
Animal families